La Jemaye-Ponteyraud is a commune in the department of Dordogne, southwestern France. The municipality was established on 1 January 2017 by merger of the former communes of La Jemaye (the seat) and Ponteyraud.

See also 
Communes of the Dordogne department

References 

Communes of Dordogne
Dordogne communes articles needing translation from French Wikipedia